The 1990 World Women's Curling Championship was held at the Rocklundahallen in Västerås, Sweden from April 1–7.  

The women's winner was team Norway, skipped by Dordi Nordby. Norway won its first Women's World Championship in Nordby's first season skipping the Norwegian women's team. She defeated Scotland in the final, 4–2, which was skipped by a 21 year-old Carolyn Hutchinson. Norway controlled the game, not letting Scotland play the "come around game". 

The event was held in conjunction with the 1990 World Men's Curling Championship and was televised in Canada on The Sports Network. Had a team gone undefeated, a four-team playoff would not have been necessary.

Teams

Round-robin standings

*First Appearance

Round-robin results

Draw 1

Draw 2

Draw 3

Draw 4

Draw 5

Draw 6

Draw 7

Draw 8

Draw 9

Tiebreaker

Playoffs

Final

References

 

World Women's Curling Championship
Curling
World Women's Curling Championship, 1990
Sports competitions in Västerås
Women's curling competitions in Sweden
April 1990 sports events in Europe
International curling competitions hosted by Sweden